Black Bart may refer to:

People
 Bartholomew Roberts (1682–1722), Welsh pirate
 Black Bart (outlaw) (1829 – after 1888), English-American outlaw
 Black Bart (wrestler) (born 1948), stage name of American professional wrestler Rick Harris

Other uses
 Black Bart (film), a 1948 western film based on the life of the outlaw
 Black Bart (theatre), a musical theater group
 Black Bart (TV series), an unaired TV pilot based on the movie Blazing Saddles

Black, Bart

Nicknames
Nicknames in crime